Bandhan is a Bengali romantic family drama movie released in 2004. It was directed by Rabi Kinagi, and featured Jeet, Koyel Mullick in a double role, Oindrila Sen and Victor Banerjee in the lead role. Bandhan was hugely successful in west Bengal. It was the highest grossing Bengali film of 2004. The film was a remake of the Telugu film Santosham and the Tamil film Unnai Thedi.

Plot
The story is one of the pivotal characters, Mina narrating the story so far and introducing the family members Everybody is very kind and loves her very much, but his father is very strict and angry person. Mina is no more. Her husband Rohit and son Rony live in Singapore, but they have no contact with Mina's family because Mina had married against her family's will. Presently, Chumki, Mina's cousin is to get married. Her mother Sabitri Devi and most of her family wants Rohit to be a part of the wedding but her father is against it. However Sabitri Devi is stubborn and ultimately succeeds in being able to invite Rohit for the wedding. Rohit is welcomed by the entire family except Pratap Narayan and his son. Rohit is constantly humiliated by the two of them but he doesn't lose hope and does not get hostile. He also explains to Rony as to why he is unwanted in the family. Meanwhile, Mina's twin sister, Rina comes home. Rony looks up to her as his mother while Rohit and she get closer. Rohit and Rony are slowly accepted by Pratap Narayan but things complicate again when Rina's marriage is fixed elsewhere. Rina insists on marrying Rohit but he does not want to face the family rejection again. In the meantime, a letter written by Rina and addressed to Rohit falls into Pratap Narayan's hands and he drives Rohit out of his house again. Things finally are settled and Pratap Narayan goes to the station to get Rohit back.

Cast
 Jeet as Rohit
 Koyel Mullick as Mina / Rina in double role
 Victor Banerjee as Pratap Narayan Chowdhury, Mina & Rina's Father
 Biswajit Chakraborty
 Oindrila Sen as Roni's Maternal Cousin
 YourPritam as Roni's Cousin
 Sumanta Mukherjee as Aditya Narayan Chowdhury, Mina & Rina's Uncle
 Soma Dey as Mina & Rina's Mother
 Santana Bose
 Locket Chatterjee as Sonali, Sister-in-law of Mina & Rina
 Raja Chattopadhyay as Pradip Chowdhury, Brother of Mina/Rina
 Shyamal Dutta as Raghu Da
 Master Angshu as Roni
 Ravishankar Pande
 Sonali Chakraborty
 Shantilal Mukherjee as Priyo Da

Crew
 Producer: Shree Venkatesh Films
 Director: Rabi Kinagi
 Story: Rabi Kinagi
 Dialogue: Priyo Chattopadhyay
 Lyrics:  Gautam Susmit
 Music:  Jeet Ganguly
 Editing: Suresh Urs
 Cinematography: Rajan Kinagi
 Singer: Sonu Nigam, Shreya Ghoshal, Shaan, Sadhana Sargam, Raghab Chatterjee

Soundtrack

References

External links
 

2004 films
2000s Bengali-language films
Bengali-language Indian films
Films directed by Rabi Kinagi
Bengali remakes of Telugu films
Indian romantic drama films
Indian family films
Films set in Singapore